Eunice Renshaw Geiger (April 30, 1893 - January 4, 1982) is an American former First Lady of Guam.

Early life 
On April 30, 1893, Geiger was born as Eunice Renshaw Thompson in Pensacola, Florida.

Career 
In 1944, during World War II at the Battle of Guam, when Roy Geiger recapture Guam and became the military Governor of Guam, Geiger became the First Lady of Guam on July 21, 1944, until August 10, 1944.

Personal life 
Geiger met Roy Geiger while he was in Pensacola, Florida. On 1917, Geiger married Roy Geiger (1885-1947), who later became a General of United States Marine Corps and the First Military Governor of Guam.  They had two children, Roy and Joyce. Geiger and her family lived in places including Pensacola, Florida, Philadelphia, Pennsylvania, Haiti, and Newport, Rhode Island. 

Geiger's daughter Joyce Geiger Johnson (1918-2011) became a member of the  Olympic Swim Team. She was a Red Cross Chairman in Quantico, Virginia. She also became a field director of the Girl Scouts. 

Geiger's son is Roy Stanley Geiger Jr. (1920-2014), who was an Army Col. 

On January 4, 1982, Geiger died. Geiger is buried at Arlington National Cemetery, in Arlington, Virginia.

References

External links 
 Eunice Renshaw Geiger at findagrave.com

1893 births
1982 deaths
Burials at Arlington National Cemetery
First Ladies and Gentlemen of Guam
People from Newport, Rhode Island
People from Pensacola, Florida